Texas sage may refer to:

 Leucophyllum frutescens, an evergreen shrub in the figwort family, native to Texas, that is not a true sage
 Salvia coccinea, blood sage
 Salvia texana, a Salvia that is also native to Texas